The R-class or Romolo-class submarine was a group of submarines built for the Royal Italian Navy (Regia Marina Italiana) during World War II. They were designed as blockade running transport submarines for transporting high-value cargo from Europe to Japan and vice versa. Axis-occupied Europe lacked strategic materials such as tungsten, tin and some commodities such as rubber.

Design and description
The R-class submarines displaced  surfaced and  submerged.

For surface running, the boats were powered by two  diesel engines, each driving one propeller shaft. When submerged each propeller was driven by a  electric motor. They could reach  on the surface and  underwater.

The boats were only armed for self-defense with three  light anti-aircraft guns. Some boats may have been equipped with a pair of internal  torpedo tubes in the bow and stern.

Boats 
Twelve boats were ordered, but only two were completed, by Tosi:
 Remo, named after Remus, launched 28 March 1943 – Sunk by the British submarine HMS United 15 July 1943 in the Gulf of Taranto
 Romolo, named after Romulus, launched 21 March 1943 – Sunk by Allied aircraft near Augusta 18 July 1943.

The remaining 10 hulls were scuttled incomplete and scrapped after the war.

The sail of submarine R12 is now exhibited as a monument on the seafront of Gaeta.

See also
 Merchant submarine
 , an unarmed transport submarine built by Germany in World War I.

Notes

Bibliography

External links
 Sommergibili Marina Militare website

R class submarines, Italian
 
 R class
Ships built by Cantieri navali Tosi di Taranto
Merchant submarines